The Wheel in Space is the mostly missing seventh and final serial of the fifth season in the British science fiction television series Doctor Who, which originally aired in six weekly parts from 27 April to 1 June 1968.

In this serial, the Doctor (Patrick Troughton) and his travelling companion Jamie McCrimmon (Frazer Hines) become stranded on a seemingly abandoned spaceship called Silver Carrier. They make contact with and board another wheel-shaped space station known as W3, only to discover that a small group of Cybermen have followed and plan on using the wheel's radio link to Earth as a beacon for their invasion fleet. This serial is notable for the first appearance of Wendy Padbury as companion Zoe Heriot.

Only two of the six episodes are held in the BBC archives; four still remain missing.

Plot

The explosion of the mercury fluid link forces the Second Doctor and Jamie to evacuate the TARDIS to avoid mercury fumes, and until the mercury can be replaced, the spacecraft is marooned. They find themselves on a space vessel, deserted apart from a Servo-Robot. The robot detects the intruders and redirects the rocket from aimless wandering. The shock of a course change causes the Doctor to hit his head, concussing him. The robot also releases a group of egg-shaped white pods into space, which direct themselves toward a nearby spaceship shaped like a giant wheel, attaching themselves to its exterior. When the robot becomes aggressive, Jamie destroys it, but the Doctor is very weak and collapses.

The Wheel is an Earth space station observing phenomena in deep space and is staffed with a small international crew. The crew are concerned by the sudden drops in pressure, which, unbeknown to them, coincide with the pods attaching themselves to the exterior of the Wheel. Controller Jarvis Bennett is also worried that the Silver Carrier, a missing supply vessel eighty million miles off course, has suddenly turned up nearby and is not responding to radio contact. He decides to destroy it with the Wheel's x-ray laser.

Jarvis is prevented from doing so when they hear a deafening burst of noise from the vessel. Jamie alerts them to his presence aboard the Carrier and he and the unconscious Doctor are rescued and taken aboard the Wheel. While the resident medic, Dr. Gemma Corwyn, sees to the Doctor, Jamie is given a guided tour by the astrophysicist librarian, Zoe Heriot.

Gemma knows that Jamie is lying, so Bennett remains suspicious of the new arrivals, fearing they could be saboteurs opposed to the space program. He decides to use the x-ray laser on the Carrier now that the two refugees have been rescued, not realizing that the TARDIS is still on board, but Jamie sabotages the laser.

Meanwhile, on board the rocket, two pods similar to the ones which attached themselves to the Wheel draw energy from around it. A three-fingered silver hand punches out of the top of one of them.

Jamie's sabotage of the laser infuriates Bennett, especially as there is a potential meteor shower heading for the Wheel and they now have no way to repel it. Jarvis confines Jamie and the Doctor to the sickbay. When the Doctor recovers, he does not approve of Jamie's action. Zoe has calculated that the ship did not drift to their sector but was deliberately piloted there. The Wheel's crew, however, are more concerned with the impending meteor shower.

The two large pods contain Cybermen, who discuss their plans with the Cyberplanner (an immobile unit in control of the Cybermen) over a video communicator. The small pods they sent to the Wheel contained Cybermats which were sent to begin consuming the bernalium rods in the Wheel's stores. The bernalium is essential to power the x-ray laser. The Cybermen have engineered the star in Messier 13 to go nova, forcing the Wheel crew to look to their bernalium stores only to find them missing. The Cybermen expect the crewmen will come to the Silver Carrier for an alternate source of bernalium, which can then be transported into the Wheel – with a surprise inside.

Engineer Bill Duggan has noticed the depleted stocks and the presence of the Cybermats. His delay in reacting allows another crewman, Kemel Rudkin, to fall victim to the Cybermats. Jarvis Bennett overreacts with panic to this state of affairs, stripping Duggan of his position and imposing tighter controls. The Doctor uses the x-ray machine to scan a floor plate, which Rudkin had sprayed with quick-setting plastic, revealing a Cybermat. Jarvis sends two crewmen, Laleham and Vallance, to the Silver Carrier to look for bernalium. Once there, the Cybermen reveal themselves and take control of their minds. They then order the crewmen to take them to the Wheel.

Laleham and Vallance are used to prepare the bernalium crates destined for the Wheel with two Cybermen hidden inside. This ruse works, and the crates are ready to board the Wheel. The Doctor and Jamie try to warn Dr. Corwyn and Bennett, but the controller does not accept the danger. Indeed, Dr. Corwyn, who has formed an alliance with the Doctor, fears for Bennett's mental state.

Duggan and Leo Ryan are glad to have access to a new power supply for the laser, which they are repairing. An engineer is killed by the emerging Cybermen when he is sent to fetch the new bernalium supply. Laleham and Vallance arrive at the laser with the bernalium for Duggan, who falls victim to the same mind control process used earlier. Duggan is sent to destroy communications with the Earth. He smashes the control panel and gets electrocuted to death afterwards.

The Doctor deduces that the fortuitous supply of bernalium has a deeper significance. Reasoning that Duggan was mind controlled, he instructs Dr. Corwyn to use a basic transistor system attached to each of the crews' necks to repel this technique. In the loading bay, the Doctor and Jamie discover the crate's false bottom, which confirms the presence of the Cybermen aboard the Wheel. Behind them, a Cyberman is coming down the steps.

The Cyberman leaves with some bernalium, not detecting the Doctor and Jamie. However, they are then ambushed by Cybermats. The crew use a sonic wave to disable the Cybermats. Gemma and Zoe show Jarvis a dead Cybermat, but he refuses to believe that they are under attack. Gemma relieves Jarvis of his command as he's unfit to be the station controller.

The death of Duggan is no obstacle to the Cybermen as another engineer, Flannigan, is found to replace him. Laleham is killed trying to subdue Flannigan when Vallance misses with a gun. A Cyberman takes control of Flannigan's mind. The Cybermen have invested time in repairing the x-ray laser. When the meteorites are due to hit, they can be deflected and obliterated. The Cybermen want the Wheel intact so they can use its radio beam for their fleet to home in on. They want to invade the Earth, desperate for the planet's mineral wealth.

The human crew repair the x-ray laser and use it to defend against the incoming meteorites. The Doctor decides that he needs the time vector generator, which he earlier removed from the TARDIS. Jamie and Zoe are chosen for a space-walk to the rocket. Gemma shows them to the airlock but hides in the oxygen room. She overhears Vallance and a Cyberman plotting to poison the air supply and warns the Doctor before she is killed by a Cyberman. Meanwhile, Jamie and Zoe are caught up in the meteor shower.

Leo switches to sectional air supply, meaning that the Cybermen cannot poison their air. Shocked back to consciousness by Gemma's death, the insane Jarvis Bennett is killed when he seeks revenge. Leo assumes control as the Doctor warns there is a vast Cyberman spacecraft heading for the Wheel.

The Cyberplanner suspects that someone aboard knows of their methods. Vallance identifies everyone on board, and the Cyberplanner recognises the Doctor. The Cyberplanner decides that he must be killed. Jamie and Zoe tune into this conversation aboard the rocket and go back with the time vector generator to warn the Doctor.

The humans need to contact Earth, but Duggan's suicide mission made this impossible. They need spare parts. Flannigan pretends to be normal and says he will meet up with the Doctor in corridor 6 and give them to him. This is a plan by the Cybermen to ambush the Doctor. The Doctor suspects this and goes through the air tunnels to the power room to fetch them. When the Cybermen don't find him in corridor 6, they order Flannigan to go to the control room and destroy the forcefield.

Jamie and Zoe get back, and Flannigan takes them to the control room. He is overwhelmed by Leo and Enrico Casali, the communications officer, and his conditioning is broken. The Doctor is cornered in the powerhouse by the two Cybermen and they reveal their plans to him. When they try to destroy him, he electrocutes one. A large group of Cybermen start spacewalking towards the Wheel. Jamie and Flannigan go to the loading bay and free Vallance from cyber-control. Flannigan uses quick-setting plastic in a fire extinguisher to kill the last Cyberman and then turns on the deflector shield, which deflects the Cybermen into space. The Doctor uses the time vector generator to boost the power of the x-ray laser and destroys the advancing Cybership.

With the invasion repelled, the Doctor and Jamie return to the Silver Carrier with the mercury they need to repair the TARDIS. They are accompanied by Zoe, who stows away as they depart. She is determined to stay and so, to warn her of the dangers ahead, the Doctor uses a mental device to project images from his mind to the viewscreen, which tell her of his and Jamie's encounter with the Daleks in their search for the Dalek Factor.

Production
The story's working title was The Space Wheel. This serial was the first time the BBC Radiophonic Workshop were called upon to provide the backing score.

A brief clip from this story was later re-used in episode 10 of The War Games at the close of the next season.

The spacesuits worn by Jamie and Zoe, previously seen in The Tenth Planet, later were used as costumes in Star Wars Episode IV: A New Hope and The Empire Strikes Back (most famously worn by Bossk the Bounty Hunter). The suit is a High-Altitude Windak Pressure Suit used by the RAF in the 1960s.

Cast notes
Patrick Troughton did not appear in episode 2 as he was on holiday.  Thus, a body double was used to substitute for the unconscious Doctor. Deborah Watling's appearance in episode 1 was a recap from the end of the previous story Fury from the Deep. Unusually, she received an on-screen credit for this appearance.

Michael Goldie previously played Craddock in The Dalek Invasion of Earth (1964). Kenneth Watson had played Craddock in the film version of the same story: Daleks' Invasion Earth 2150 A.D. (1966). Clare Jenkins had played Nanina in The Savages (1966) and would go on to briefly reprise her role as Tanya Lernov in the final episode of The War Games (1969). Donald Sumpter would go on to play Commander Ridgeway in The Sea Devils (1972) and the President in "Hell Bent" (2015). He played Erasmus Darkening in the Who spin-off The Sarah Jane Adventures story The Eternity Trap (2009).

Missing episodes
Only Episodes 3 and 6 exist in the BBC Archives. Episode 6 was transmitted from a 35 mm film negative and retained in the BBC Film Library (although Episode 5 was not, despite also being transmitted from a similar reel). A private collector obtained a copy of Episode 3 and returned it in 1983. In 1996 two short clips of Duggan's death (one lasting just one second, the other lasting two) from Episode 4 were located in Australia, having been cut by ABC censors when the serial was originally screened in 1969. In 2002 three short clips from Episode 5, totalling seven seconds, were found in a private collection in New Zealand, having been removed by censors there. In 2023, stock footage of a hippo from Episode 1 was discovered in the second episode of the 1965 David Attenborough series Zambezi.

Broadcast and reception

 Episode is missing

The Wheel in Space has received a mixed-to-negative reception. Paul Cornell, Martin Day, and Keith Topping wrote of the serial in The Discontinuity Guide (1995), "Dull, lifeless and so derivative of other base-under-siege stories that it isn't really a story in its own right. Despite the detailed Wheel setting, the galloping lack of scientific credibility is annoying, and the Cybermen are so bland and ordinary they could have been any other monster." In The Television Companion (1998), David J. Howe and Stephen James Walker felt that some moments, like the death of Gemma, were "tense" and strengthened by the "very good" guest cast, and the story was also "enjoyable" in some aspects and Zoe's debut was promising. However, they criticised the Cyberman's plan, which was "logical and well worked out" but "so convoluted that it seriously strains the viewer's credulity". In 2009, Patrick Mulkern of Radio Times praised the introduction of Zoe, her dynamic with Jamie, and the supporting character of Gemma. However, he felt the story had a "clunkingly tortuous plot", which was too complicated, not threatening, and ended "somewhat flatly".

Commercial releases

In print

A novelisation of this serial, written by Terrance Dicks, was published by Target Books in March 1988. Only 23,000 copies of the paperback edition were circulated (reportedly due to stocks being destroyed in a warehouse fire), leading to this book becoming a rare collectible.

Home media
In July 1992 Episodes 3 and 6 were released on VHS as part of the Cybermen: The Early Years collection. They were later released on DVD in November 2004 in the three-disc Lost in Time set: the censor clips from Episodes 4 and 5 were also included. All six episodes' original audio tracks were released on CD with narration by Wendy Padbury in May 2004.

On 6 July 2017 Nerdist announced a sneak peek of a new reconstruction of The Wheel in Space, using existing clips and Tele-snaps. The reconstruction was released in September 2017 as an exclusive to Britbox, a streaming service formed by the BBC and ITV.

An abridged animated version of Episode 1 utilising ten minutes of the surviving audio premiered at the BFI's Missing Believed Wiped event in December 2018. It omits several scenes, including the introduction of the crew on the wheel, a gag about the TARDIS' cubic foods and references to Victoria's departure in the previous story, Fury from the Deep. This animation was included as a special feature on the home media release of The Macra Terror in March 2019.

References

External links

Photonovel of The Wheel in Space on the BBC website

Target novelisation

Second Doctor serials
Doctor Who missing episodes
Doctor Who serials novelised by Terrance Dicks
Cybermen television stories
1968 British television episodes
Fiction set around Messier 13
Fiction about novae
Television episodes set in outer space